The Tinkerer (Phineas Mason) is a fictional character appearing in American comic books published by Marvel Comics. The character is usually depicted as an adversary of the superhero Spider-Man and the father of Rick Mason. The character was created by Stan Lee and Steve Ditko, and made his first appearance in The Amazing Spider-Man #2 (May 1963). The Tinkerer is generally depicted as a genius in engineering who is able to create gadgets and other devices from nothing more than spare parts left over from ordinary household appliances. While in his initial appearances he sought to personally eliminate Spider-Man, more recent storylines depict him under the employ of other supervillains, whom he supplies with his gadgets for their personal vendettas against Spider-Man or other heroes.

Since his introduction in comics, the character has been adapted into several other forms of media, such as animated television series and video games. The Tinkerer made his live-action debut in the Marvel Cinematic Universe film Spider-Man: Homecoming (2017), portrayed by Michael Chernus.

Publication history
The Tinkerer is a character that was created by Stan Lee and Steve Ditko, as part of the original publication of The Amazing Spider-Man and made his first initial appearance in The Amazing Spider-Man #2 (April 1963), opposing Spider-Man as a villain. It would, however, be several years before he would return, and made his second appearance in The Amazing Spider-Man #160 (September 1976), once again opposing Spider-Man in a losing effort. The Tinkerer would be mentioned in The Amazing Spider-Man #182 (July 1978). This was his first mention in the publication as a supporting side character to the other villains.

Fictional character biography

Criminal career
Phineas Mason is a brilliant inventor and technician who designs advanced weaponry for criminals and sometimes undertakes crimes of his own. As "the Terrible Tinkerer", he runs an underground fix-it shop disguised as a radio repair shop. On at least one occasion, a potential customer gained the inventor's attention by presenting a transistor radio and telling Mason that "I've got a radio that just can't carry a tune". The Tinkerer's original scheme involved the employment of a team of petty has-been stuntmen and thugs. They specialized in placing bugs into radios and blackmailing state officials and politicians. The Tinkerer tried to present himself as an alien to confuse his pursuers by leaving behind a mask that looked like his face when he escaped from Spider-Man in a hovercraft shaped like a flying saucer.

The Tinkerer's next encounter with Spider-Man resulted in deploying the Toy, a hi-tech robot that serves as an assistant and lackey. The Toy also helped the Tinkerer escape from his hideout when raided by the police. The Tinkerer is known to have created the suit for Mysterio, a man that once worked as one of his alien-suited servants. Much later, he was hired by the Kingpin to rebuild the Spider-Mobile to destroy Spider-Man. The Tinkerer redesigned Rocket Racer's rocket-powered skateboard, designed the armed wheel-shaped Big Wheel vehicle, repaired the Goldbug's bug-ship., and designed some technological hardware so that Joseph Rambo can become Binary Bug. He robbed loan companies by using remote-controlled toys until stopped by Spider-Man. The Tinkerer also provided Whirlwind with improved armor and weaponry, provided Diamondback with new throwing diamonds, built the Grim Reaper's scythe-like weapon to go over where his right hand was, provided Mac Gargan with a modified scorpion tail during the "Acts of Vengeance" storyline, and even fixed Grizzly's exo-skeleton harness and grizzly suit. He has worked for Hammerhead (who was mentioned to have made Hammerhead's exoskeleton), the Beetle (who Tinkerer helped to make a new Beetle armor), the Black Cat (who received special equipment from him that enhanced her agility, senses, and strength), the Jack O'Lantern, Owl (who made special equipment for him), the Ani-Men, Jester (who made a number of gimmicks for him), and the Constrictor.

Since he is a small business operator who works alone (and arms criminals), the Terrible Tinkerer takes precautions to prevent being cheated. For instance, Killer Shrike commissioned the Tinkerer to improve weapon gauntlets. At delivery time, the criminal decided to use the weapons to threaten the inventor and avoid paying. The gauntlets backfired on Killer Shrike, wounding and immobilizing due to a failsafe the Tinkerer engineers into his products for such situations.

Mason is forced to work for the Vulture (Adrian Toomes) interested in freeing Nitro from custody. This falls apart when the heroic mutants Rusty Collins and Skids chance upon the situation and defeat the villains. The Tinkerer is arrested off-panel.

The Trapster later sued the Tinkerer for selling faulty equipment. The Trapster's character witnesses in the case against the Tinkerer include the Beetle, Blacklash, Blizzard, Boomerang, Jack O'Lantern, Mad Thinker, Porcupine, Ringer, Stilt-Man, Spymaster and Taskmaster. When Taskmaster accuses the other villains of not properly using the equipment that the Tinkerer provided, it resulted in an in-court brawl that was broken up by She-Hulk which leads to the villains getting arrested. When the Tinkerer and Mad Thinker ask She-Hulk who is superior, She-Hulk says to sort it out themselves and storms off.

His son Rick Mason is a world-class mercenary for the American government and freelance operative. Despite the two being on opposite sides of the law, father and son remained on good terms and met frequently. The Tinkerer even aided Rick from time to time, and once provided his son with information about a coup in South America. After Rick was seemingly killed in action, the grief-stricken father decided to mend his ways while still maintaining links to supervillains to give information he could discreetly pass along.

In the Secret War miniseries, Nick Fury discovered a link between the weaponry of most of the known technology-based villains in the Marvel Universe and the kingdom of Latveria. The Tinkerer was revealed to have received a vast portion of his funding and presumably the resources and technology from which he has developed most of his clients' arsenals over the years from Latveria. This was part of an ongoing "terrorist" initiative fostered by the kingdom's despotic leader Doctor Doom and minion Countess Luciana Von Bardas. S.H.I.E.L.D. agents discovered the Tinkerer's workshop by using Killer Shrike as a mole. When the agents converged on the workshop, the canny villain detected this. Killer Shrike was struck down by the Tinkerer's security systems, and the Tinkerer fled to Latveria rather than face justice. Early in the Marvel Knights imprint of Spider-Man, Eddie Brock sells the Venom symbiote through an auction put on by the Tinkerer.

The Punisher finds and confronts the Tinkerer after a confrontation with the murderous Stilt-Man to which Tinkerer begs for death. Not only was his son dead, but his grandson perished in the Stamford, Connecticut explosion that heralded the Civil War's beginning. Without his beloved son or grandson, he was suicidal and continued his work in the hope that both superheroes and supervillains would wipe each other out. The Punisher stabs the Tinkerer in the back, likely leaving him paralyzed. Now reliant on a wheelchair, Mason has been contracted by Silas "Cyber" Burr to subject the resurrected villain's new body to the Adamantium-epidermal bonding process. Mason agrees to create a "pacemaker" for the ailing Cyber's heart condition, as well as three carbonadium bullets for Logan in exchange for the use of Logan's mysterious carbonadium synthesizer. Cyber awakens from the procedure to discover the deadly radioactive device permanently attached to the chest and that Logan has disappeared with the C-synth. Phineas is last seen in the enraged Cyber's clutches. Surviving his encounter with Cyber, he is seen attending the Survivors' Guild, a therapy group for survivors of the Punisher. He is later apprehended by Iron Man for ties to a super WMD black market.

During the "Secret Invasion" storyline, he is freed from Prison 42 to help Human Torch, Thing, Franklin Richards and Valeria Richards return to the Earth dimension. It is mentioned that Mason had retired the Tinkerer identity but is imprisoned for breaking the Registration Act anyway. He is initially reluctant to help his old foes, but Franklin's and Valeria's resemblance to his own grandchildren causes him to relent. It was revealed Rick is in fact still alive, under deep cover, and in a conspiracy which resulted in Carol Danvers's apparent murder for Norman Osborn in exchange for his father's release and cleared record. The Tinkerer is later seen in jail where he repairs Hypno-Hustler's costume.

Phil Urich later visits the Tinkerer to have the Hobgoblin's gear upgraded to evade the Superior Spider-Man (Doctor Octopus' mind in Spider-Man's body). It is shown that the Tinkerer has taken in Tiberius Stone as a secret apprentice as Stone gets revenge on the Hobgoblin by making it so that the Hobgoblin's tech fails.

He fabricated the identity of his own brother Hophni Mason via a robotic suit. As Hophni, he acted a confidant of various superheroes (such as Ant-Man and Captain America), and both provided technology and an acquaintance to Teresa Parker. His façade is revealed to which he used his said disguise as a battlesuit which gets defeated by Spider-Man. However, it is revealed that Tinkerer is an ally to the Vedomi alien race of sentient A.I.s. After escaping from custody, the Tinkerer (equipped with the Vedomi's battlesuit) battles Spider-Man. Spider-Man realized the Tinkerer was sorrowful and resentful towards humanity and help change his point of view and stay with the Vedomi to help guide positively.

Skills and abilities
Phineas Mason has a genius-level intellect with extensive knowledge in various sciences. He is capable of designing and manufacturing numerous inventions derived from pre-existing technologies. The Tinkerer can access to a wide array of advanced devices if needed. The Tinkerer's old age limits his physical abilities.

Other versions

Amazing Spider-Man: Renew Your Vows
During the "Secret Wars" storyline in the pages of Amazing Spider-Man: Renew Your Vows, a version of Tinkerer resides in the Battleworld domain of The Regency. When Regent defeated every superhero, Tinkerer gave up a life of crime and started a fix-it shop. When Spider-Man came to him for Inhibitor Chips (to conceal the superhuman signatures of himself and his daughter Annie), Tinkerer stalled until the Sinister Six could arrive, although Spider-Man managed to steal the Inhibitor Chips and escape.

Old Man Logan
On Earth-807127, Tinkerer was mentioned by Pappy Banner where he built an Adamantium suit of armor that ran on gamma energy. By the time Banner's head was placed on the Adamantium armor so that he can take revenge on Old Man Logan for the defeat that cost Pappy Banner his body, he admitted that he ate Tinkerer after the Adamantium armor was complete.

Ultimate Marvel
The Ultimate Marvel incarnation of Phineas Mason is a scientific prodigy at Nursery Two, one of the think tanks of young geniuses sponsored by the U.S. government. The Mole Man kidnapped Mason and his fellow students with the intention of using them to seed a new underground civilization in Subterranea. With the Fantastic Four's help, the Nursery Two students defeated Mole Man. Rather than return to their lives above ground, Mason and his teammates opted to stay behind and start a civilization on their own terms.

The Ultimate Marvel equivalent of Tinkerer is Elijah Stern, an original character created by Brian Michael Bendis and Mark Bagley, and designed to resemble Paul Giamatti. This iteration's alias key indicator is stating that he merely "tinkers". The Tinkerer vindictively hires Killer Shrike, Omega Red and the Vulture (Blackie Drago) to torment his former Donald Roxxon for being fired by the Roxxon Corporation after discovering a way to use vibranium as a power source. His plan gets foiled by the original Spider-Man and he is given a choice to work for Nick Fury or death when S.H.I.E.L.D. finds his hideout. Choosing to work for S.H.I.E.L.D., the Tinkerer commands his Spider-Slayer robots in going after the Carnage symbiote and Peter Parker.

While repairing the Beetle's suit, the Tinkerer is approached to accommodate a group of villains with weapons against Spider-Man. As the Tinkerer is reluctant to take up the accommodations due to the Tinkerer stating that the Vulture hasn't paid him last time and the fact that he still blames the Vulture for bringing S.H.I.E.L.D. to his door, the Green Goblin "motivates" him to help. The Tinkerer does so by providing the Vulture's suit stating that nobody can fit it. Kraven the Hunter helps himself to some blasters and knives stating that he is starting a tab.

The Prowler (Aaron Davis) later breaks into his workshop, getting interrogated before being killed in cold blood once his killer realized things about the new Spider-Man.

In other media

Television
 The Phineas Mason incarnation of Tinkerer appears in The Spectacular Spider-Man, voiced by Thom Adcox-Hernandez. This version is depicted as younger and with more hair than his comics counterpart. Following a minor appearance in the season one episode "Persona" while working for the Chameleon until he is arrested, Mason appears in season two as the Tinkerer and the Master Planner's right-hand man. Additionally, the former designs Mysterio's equipment, oversees the Sinister Six's work, upgrades the Vulture's suit, and is hired by Tombstone to create powered suits for the Enforcers.
 The Phineas Mason incarnation of Tinkerer appears in Spider-Man, voiced by Aaron Abrams. This version is an eccentric inventor capable of creating various forms of machinery from everyday appliances and primarily creates them for his own amusement.
 The Phineas Mason incarnation of Tinkerer appears in Marvel Super Hero Adventures, voiced by Michael Daingerfield. This version creates children’s toys that serve evil purposes.

Film
Phineas Mason appears in the Marvel Cinematic Universe film Spider-Man: Homecoming (2017), portrayed by Michael Chernus. Depicted around Elijah Stern's age, this version is a weapons maker and was part of a salvage company alongside Adrian Toomes, Herman Schultz and Jackson Brice. When the salvaging company went out of business due to the Department of Damage Control, Mason helps Toomes steal leftover technology from the Avengers' battles and build advanced weapons out of it, such as Toomes' flight suit and modified versions of Crossbones's vibro-blast emitting gauntlets. While his associates are defeated by Spider-Man and arrested by the authorities, Mason's fate is left unknown.

Video games
 The Phineas Mason incarnation of Tinkerer appeared as the first boss in the Sega Master System version of Spider-Man vs. The Kingpin.
 The Phineas Mason incarnation of Tinkerer appeared in Spider-Man. He serves as a boss in the Sega Genesis version and makes a cameo appearance in the SNES version.
 The Phineas Mason incarnation of Tinkerer appears as a boss in the PS2 and PSP versions of Spider-Man: Web of Shadows, voiced by William Utay.
 The Phineas Mason incarnation of Tinkerer appears in Marvel: Ultimate Alliance 2, voiced by Philip Proctor. He uses the Fold, a nanite hive mind that has brainwashed supervillains that Iron Man injected control nanites into, to achieve his goals until he is defeated by the heroes.
 The Phineas Mason incarnation of Tinkerer appears as a boss in the Nintendo DS version of Spider-Man: Shattered Dimensions, voiced by Jim Cummings in an homage to Sterling Holloway. He utilizes a fragment of the Tablet of Order and Chaos to power a machine capable of creating an army of robots. However, Spider-Man tracks him down and destroys it.
 The Phineas Mason incarnation of Tinkerer appears as a playable character and mini-boss in Lego Marvel Super Heroes 2, voiced by Kevin Coello.
 A female variation of Phineas Mason / Tinkerer named Phin Mason appears as the final boss in Spider-Man: Miles Morales, voiced by Jasmin Savoy Brown. She is an African-American teenager and Miles Morales's childhood best friend who seeks revenge against Roxxon after her brother Rick Mason died trying to expose the company's corruption. As the Tinkerer, she becomes the leader of the criminal group, the Underground, whom she supplies with her advanced programmable matter technology, and comes into conflict with the second Spider-Man, who she eventually learns is Morales. In the end, Phin sees the error of her ways and sacrifices herself to save Morales when her vendetta almost destroys Harlem.

References

External links
 Tinkerer at Marvel.com
 Tinkerer at Comic Vine
 Tinkerer at Writeups.org

Characters created by Stan Lee
Characters created by Steve Ditko
Comics characters introduced in 1963
Fictional engineers
Fictional inventors
Marvel Comics scientists
Marvel Comics supervillains
Spider-Man characters